Eudryas unio, the pearly wood-nymph, is a species of moth of the family Noctuidae. It is found in most of the eastern United States from central New Hampshire and southern Ontario, south to southern Florida. In the west it ranges to the eastern Great Plains, south to southern Texas and Veracruz along the eastern coast of Mexico. There are isolated populations in central Utah and California. The California population might be considered a distinct subspecies or even species, brevipennis.

The wingspan is 26–35 mm. Adults are on wing from May to August.

The larvae feed on Vitis, Oenothera biennis, Ludwigia, Lythrum, Decodon verticillatus and Hibiscus. The California population has been recorded from Epilobium ciliatum and Oenothera.

External links
 Species info
 Bug Guide

Moths described in 1831
Agaristinae
Moths of North America